Parastylonurus is a genus of prehistoric eurypterid. It is classified within the Parastylonuridae family and contains three species, P. hendersoni and P. ornatus from the Silurian of Scotland and P. sigmoidalis from the Silurian of England.

Description 
Parastylonurus was a stylonuroid of small to medium size with a rounded prosoma wider than it was long. The eyes were located on the anterior half of the carapace and the metasoma was very long. The first three walking legs were very short with single opposable spines on every joint. The last two walking legs were very long, reaching to the last tergite. The opisthosoma was narrow and undifferentiated and the telson was spike-like.

Classification 
Parastylonurus can be differentiated from the closely related Stylonurus in that it lacks the distinct trilobation present in Stylonurus and by the position of the eyes.

Species 
Parastylonurus contains three valid species, with other named species now seen as invalid or as part of other genera.
 Parastylonurus hendersoni Waterston, 1979 - Pentland Hills, Scotland (Silurian)
 Parastylonurus ornatus Laurie, 1892 - Scotland (Silurian)
 Parastylonurus? sigmoidalis Kjellesvig-Waering, 1971 - Shropshire, England (Silurian)
Invalid or reassigned species are listed below:
 "Parastylonurus" beecheri Hall, 1884 - Pennsylvania, USA (Devonian), reclassified as a species of Stylonurella.
 "Parastylonurus" macrophthalmus Laurie, 1892 - Pentland Hills, Scotland (Silurian), reclassified as a species of Hardieopterus.
 "Parastylonurus" megalops Salter, 1859 - Herefordshire, England (Silurian), reclassified as a species of Hardieopterus.
 "Parastylonurus" myops Clarke, 1907 - Eastern USA (Silurian), reclassified as a species of Hardieopterus.
 "Parastylonurus" rusti Ruedemann, 1926 - New York, USA (Ordovician), a pseudofossil.

See also 
 List of eurypterids

References 

Stylonuroidea
Silurian eurypterids
Eurypterids of Europe